Five Thurloe Square or The Thin House is a block of flats in South Kensington, London. It was built between 1885 and 1887 by William Douglas on an area of land leftover after the construction of South Kensington tube station. The building was initially used as artist studios.

References 

South Kensington
Buildings and structures completed in 1887